"Samba Sambero" is a song written by Thomas G:son and performed by Anna Book at Melodifestivalen 2007. The song participated in the semifinal inside the Kinnarps Arena in Jönköping on 3 February 2007, and headed directly for final inside the Stockholm Globe Arena on 10 March 2007, ending up on the 9th place. On 5 March 2007 the single was released, peaking at number 15 on the Swedish singles chart.

The song also charted at Svensktoppen, entering on 8 April 2007 ending up at the 10th position. The upcoming week, the song had been knocked out.

Track listing
Samba Sambero (original version)
Samba Sambero (singback version)

Charts

References

External links
Information at Svensk mediedatabas

2007 singles
2007 songs
Anna Book songs
Melodifestivalen songs of 2007
Songs written by Thomas G:son
Swedish-language songs